The Baldwin Bridge is a stone arch bridge over the Moselle in Koblenz, Germany. It is the oldest surviving bridge in the city and was built in the 14th century under Archbishop Baldwin of Luxembourg.

See also 
 List of bridges in Germany

Bridges in Germany
Stone bridges in Germany
Stone arch bridges